The 1935 Winnipeg Winnipegs finished in 1st place in the Manitoba Rugby Football Union with a 3–0 division record. The Winnipegs became the first Western Canada team to win the Grey Cup, with a victory over the Hamilton Tigers.

Exhibition games

Regular season

Standings

Schedule

Playoffs

Grey Cup

References

Winnipeg Blue Bombers seasons
Grey Cup championship seasons